Inermocoelotes microlepidus is a funnel-web spider species found in Italy, Bulgaria and Macedonia.

See also 
 List of Agelenidae species

References 

Inermocoelotes
Spiders of Europe
Spiders described in 1973